North Asia or Northern Asia, also referred to as Siberia, is the northern region of Asia, which is defined in geographical terms and is coextensive with the Asian part of Russia, and consists of three Russian regions east of the Ural Mountains: Ural, Siberia, and the Russian Far East. North Asia is bordered by the Arctic Ocean to its north; by Eastern Europe to its west; by Central and East Asia to its south; and by the Pacific Ocean and North America to its east.

Topographically, the region is dominated by the Eurasian Plate, except for its eastern part, which lies on the North American, Amurian, and Okhotsk Plates. It is divided by three major plains: the West Siberian Plain, Central Siberian Plateau, and Verhoyansk-Chukotka collision zone. The Uralian orogeny in the west raised Ural Mountains, the informal boundary between Asia and Europe. Tectonic and volcanic activities are frequently occurred in the eastern part of the region as part of the Ring of Fire, evidenced by the formation of island arcs such as the Kuril Islands and ultra-prominent peaks such as Klyuchevskaya Sopka, Kronotsky, and Koryaksky. The central part of North Asia is a large igneous province called the Siberian Traps, formed by a massive eruption occurred 250 million years ago. The formation of the traps coincided with the Permian–Triassic extinction event.

North Asia, geographically, is a subregion of Asia. However, because it was colonised and incorporated into Russia, many international organisations either consider or classify North Asia as part of Eastern Europe along with European Russia. European cultural influences, specifically Russian, are predominant in the entire region, due to it experiencing Russian emigration from Europe starting from the 18th century. Slavs and other Indo-Europeans make up the vast majority of North Asia's population, and over 85% of the region's population is of European descent.

History 

The region was first populated by hominins in the Late Pleistocene, approximately 100,000 years ago, and modern humans are confirmed to arrived in the region by 45,000 years ago with the first humans in the region having West Eurasian origins. Its Neolithic culture is characterized by characteristic stone production techniques and the presence of pottery of eastern origin. The Bronze Age began during the 3rd millennium BCE, with influences of Indo-Iranian cultures as evidenced by the Andronovo culture. During the 1st millennium BCE, polities such as the Scythians and Xiongnus emerged in the region, who often clashed with its Persian and Chinese neighbors in the south. The Göktürks dominated southern Siberia during the 1st millennium CE, while in the early 2nd millennium, the Mongol Empire and its successor states ruled the region. The Khanate of Sibir was one of the last independent Turkic states in North Asia before its conquest by the Tsardom of Russia in the 16th century. Russia would then gradually annex the region into its territory until the Convention of Peking was signed in 1860. After the October Revolution in 1917, the region was contested between the Bolsheviks and Whites until the Soviet Union asserted full control in 1923. The collapse of the Soviet Union in 1991 left Russia as the administrator of the region.

Geography 

For geographic and statistical reasons, the UN geoscheme and various other classification schemes will not subdivide countries, and thus place all of Russia in the Europe or Eastern Europe subregion.

There are no mountain chains in Northern Asia to prevent air currents from the Arctic flowing down over the plains of Siberia and Turkestan.

The plateau and plains of Northern Asia comprise the West Siberian lowlands; the Angara Shield, with the Taimyr Peninsula, the coastal lowlands (North Siberian Lowland and East Siberian Lowland), the Central Siberian Plateau, (Putorana Plateau, Lena Plateau, Anabar Plateau, Tunguska Plateau, Vilyuy Plateau, and the Lena-Angara Plateau); and the Lena–Vilyuy Lowland. Western Siberia is usually regarded as the Northwest Asia, Kazakhstan also sometimes included there. But Northwest Asia sometimes refers to Caucasus or nearby provinces.

Geomorphology 

The geomorphology of Northern Asia in general is imperfectly known, although the deposits and mountain ranges are well known.

To compensate for new sea floor having been created in the Siberian basin, the whole of the Asian Plate has pivoted about a point in the New Siberian Islands, causing compression in the Verkhoyansk mountains, which were formed along the eastern margin of the Angara Shield by tectonic uplift during the Mesozoic Era. There is a southern boundary to this across the northern margin of the Alpine folds of Afghanistan, India, Nepal, and Bhutan, which at the east of Brahmaputra turns to run south towards the Bay of Bengal along the line of the Naga hills and the Arakan Yoma, continues around Indonesia, and follows the edge of the continental shelf along the eastern seaboard of China. The Eurasian Plate and the North American Plate meet across the neck of Alaska, following the line of the Aleutian Trench, rather than meeting at the Bering Straits.

Northern Asia is built around the Angara Shield, which lies between the Yenisey River and the Lena River. It developed from fragments of Laurasia, whose rocks were mainly Precambrian crystalline rocks, gneisses, and schists, and Gondwana. These rocks can be found in the Angara Shield, Inner Mongolian-Korean Shield, Ordes Shield, and Southeast Asia Shield. The fragments have been subject to orogenesis around their margins, giving a complex of plateaux and mountain ranges. One can find outcrops of these rocks in unfolded sections of the Shields. Their presence has been confirmed below Mesozoic and later sediments.

There are three main periods of mountain building in Northern Asia, although it has occurred many times. The outer fold mountains that are on the margins of the Shields and that only affected Asia north of the line of the Himalayas, are attributed to the Caledonian and Hercynian orogenies of the late Palaeozoic Era. The Alpine orogeny caused extensive folding and faulting of Mesozoic and early Tertiary sediments from the Tethys geosyncline. The Tibetan and Mongolian plateaux, and the structural basins of Tarim, Qaidam, and Junggar, are delimited by major east–west lithospheric faults that were probably the results of stresses caused by the impact of the Indian Plate against Laurasia. Erosion of the mountains caused by this orogeny has created a large amount of sediment, which has been transported southwards to produce the alluvial plains of India, China, and Cambodia, and which has also been deposited in large amounts in the Tarim and Dzungarian basins.

Northern Asia was glaciated in the Pleistocene, but this played a less significant part in the geology of the area compared to the part that it played in North America and Europe. The Scandinavian ice sheet extended to the east of the Urals, covering the northern two thirds of the Ob Basin and extending onto the Angara Shield between the Yenisei River and the Lena River. There are legacies of mountain glaciation to be found on the east Siberian mountains, on the mountains of the Kamchatka Peninsula, on the Altai, on Tian Shan, and on other small areas of mountains, ice caps remain on the islands of Severnaya Zemlya and Novaya Zemlya, and several Central Asian mountains still have individual glaciers. North Asia itself has permafrost, ranging in depths from 30 to 600 metres and covering an area of 9.6 million km2.

Several of the mountainous regions are volcanic, with both the Koryak Mountains and the Kamchatka Peninsula having active volcanoes. The Anadyr Plateau is formed from igneous rocks. The Mongolian Plateau has an area of basaltic lavas and volcanic cones.

The Angara Shield also underlies the lowlands of the Ob River, but to the south and east in the Central Asian mountains and in the East Siberian Mountains there are folded and faulted mountains of Lower Palaeozoic rocks.

Demographics 

Most estimates are that there are around 33 million Russian citizens living east of the Ural Mountains, a widely recognized but informal geographical divide between Europe and Asia. Of these Russian citizens of Siberia, most are Slavic-origin Russians and russified Ukrainians. The Turkic peoples who are native to some parts of Siberia and native Tungusic and Mongolic peoples are now a minority in North Asia due to the Russification process during the last three centuries. Russian census records indicate they make up only an estimated 10% of the region's population, with the largest being the Buryats numbering at 445,175, and the Yakuts at 443,852 (Russian Census of 2002). According to the 2002 census, there are 500,000 Tatars in Siberia, but 300,000 of them are Volga Tatars who settled in Siberia during periods of colonization. Other ethnic groups that live in the region and make a significant portion include ethnic Germans numbering about 400,000.

In 1875, Chambers reported the population of Northern Asia to be 8 million. Between 1801 and 1914, an estimated 7 million settlers moved from European Russia to Siberia, 85% during the quarter-century before World War I.

Administration

See also

Arctic Region
Far North
European Russia
Asia
Geography of Asia
Northeast Asia
Russian Far East
Ural region
Siberian High, a semipermament anticyclone

References

 
Geography of Asia
Regions of Asia
Asia-Pacific